Red Foam is a 1920 American silent drama film directed by Ralph Ince and starring Zena Keefe, Harry Tighe and Huntley Gordon.

Cast
 Zena Keefe as Mrs. Andy Freeman 
 Harry Tighe as Andy Freeman 
 Huntley Gordon as Arnold Driscoll 
 Danny Hayes as Sheriff 
 Peggy Worth as Mrs. Murphy 
 John Butler as Matt Murphy 
 Nora Cecil as Undetermined Role

References

Bibliography
 Monaco, James. The Encyclopedia of Film. Perigee Books, 1991.

External links
 

1920 films
1920 drama films
1920s English-language films
American silent feature films
Silent American drama films
American black-and-white films
Films directed by Ralph Ince
Selznick Pictures films
1920s American films